Cross Canadian Ragweed is the debut studio album for the country rock band Cross Canadian Ragweed. It includes the singles "17" and "Constantly." The Alternate name for the album is "The Purple Album". The color was chosen in honor of Mandy Ragsdale, the younger sister of the band's drummer, Randy Ragsdale. Mandy died in a car accident near College Station, Texas and the album was dedicated to her. It was also the band's first album on the Universal South record label.

William Ruhlmann of Allmusic said, "what impresses most is the overall sound of a band who has forged a distinctive style within a conventional genre through years of playing."

Track listing
All songs written by Cody Canada except where noted.
"Anywhere but Here" (Canada, Jeremy Plato) – 4:42    
"17" – 5:19    
"Brooklyn Kid" – 3:22    
"Don't Need You" – 4:43    
"Walls of Huntsville" – 3:40    
"Broken" (Mike McClure, Canada) – 5:44    
"Constantly" – 4:17    
"Suicide Blues" – 4:36    
"Other Side" – 4:52    
"On a Cloud" – 4:18    
"Carry You Home" – 4:34    
"Freedom" (McClure, Canada) – 8:19

Personnel

Cross Canadian Ragweed
Cody Canada – lead vocals, lead guitar, harmonica, baritone guitar
Grady Cross – rhythm guitar
Jeremy Plato – bass guitar, background vocals
Randy Ragsdale – drums, percussion, piano

Additional musicians
Doug Moreland – fiddle on "On a Cloud"
Mike McClure – piano on "Freedom," acoustic guitar on "Carry You Home" and "17," electric rhythm guitar on "Walls of Huntsville"
Walt Bowers – Hammond B-3 organ on "Freedom"

Chart performance

References 

Cross Canadian Ragweed albums
2002 debut albums
Show Dog-Universal Music albums